The 2021 season is Johor Darul Ta'zim Football Club's 48th season in club history and 8th season in the Malaysia Super League after rebranding their name from Johor FC.

Background

Squad

Johor Darul Ta'zim F.C.

Johor Darul Ta'zim II F.C.

Transfers and contracts

In

 Note 
Shane Lowry played for the 1st team in the AFC Champions League but the Malaysia Premier League (Tier 2)

 Nathaniel Shio was allocated to Malaysia Premier League squad

Out

 Krasniqi returned from his loan from Newcastle Jets before going to Odisha FC.

Retained

Competitions

Overview

Malaysia Super League

Table

Malaysia Super League fixtures and results

Malaysia Cup

Group stage

Knockout stage

Quarter-finals

Johor Darul Ta'zim won 1–0 on aggregate.

Semi-finals

Johor Darul Ta'zim won 4–1 on aggregate.

Final

AFC Champions League

Table

Group stage

Club Statistics
Correct as of match played on 28 November 2021

Appearances

Johor Darul Ta'zim II

Malaysia Premier League

Table

Malaysia Premier League fixtures and results

Squad statistics

|}

References

Johor Darul Ta'zim F.C.
2021 in Malaysian football
Johor Darul Ta'zim